is the name of some Buddhist temples in Japan.

Zuiryū-ji may also refer to:

Zuiryū-ji, a Sōtō sect temple in Shichinohe, Aomori Prefecture
Zuiryū-ji, a Sōtō sect temple in Takaoka, Toyama Prefecture 
Zuiryū-ji, a Rinzai sect temple in Gifu, Gifu Prefecture
Zuiryū-ji, a Rinzai sect temple in Toyota, Aichi Prefecture
Zuiryū-ji, a Nichiren sect temple in Ōmihachiman, Shiga Prefecture
Zuiryū-ji, an Ōbaku sect temple in  Osaka, Osaka Prefecture